Costas Lapavitsas is a professor of economics at the School of Oriental and African Studies, University of London and was elected as a member of the Hellenic Parliament for the left-wing Syriza party in the January 2015 general election. He subsequently defected to the Popular Unity in August 2015.

Academic career
In 1982, Lapavitsas obtained a master's degree at the London School of Economics, followed in 1986 by a PhD at Birkbeck College, University of London. Since 1999, he has taught Economics at the School of Oriental and African Studies, first as a lecturer and since 2008 as a professor.

Political career
Lapavitsas is known for his criticism of the modern Western financial system, particularly the Greek government-debt crisis, the European debt crisis and the European Union. He is also a columnist for the British newspaper The Guardian. In 2007, he founded Research on Money and Finance (RMF), an international  network  of  political  economists focusing  on  money, finance and  the evolution of contemporary capitalism.

As early as 2011, Lapavitsas, together with some other Greek economists, has been highly eurosceptic, advocating for Greece abandoning the euro and returning to its former national currency (the drachma) as a response to the Greek government-debt crisis. On 2 March 2015, Lapavitsas wrote in The Guardian that releasing Greek people from austerity and simultaneously avoiding a major falling-out with the eurozone is an impossible task for the new government of Greece.

In July 2015, Lapavitsas endorsed Jeremy Corbyn's campaign in the Labour Party leadership election, saying: "If he succeeds - and I hope he does - he's exactly what Britain could do with, what the Labour Party could do with. I think that would be a very important move for the rest of Europe and for Greece. It would give a boost to the kind of thinking that would be necessary in the rest of Europe that is so sadly lacking at the moment. It would be the best thing to come out of Britain for Europe in a long time".

Bibliography

Books
 The Left Case Against the EU (Polity Press, 2018). 
 Marxist Monetary Theory: Collected Papers (Brill, 2017).  
  Word for word: Writings on the Greek Crisis (Athens: Topos Press, 2014). 
 Profiting Without Producing: How Finance Exploits Us All (2013). 
 Crisis in the Eurozone (2012). 
 Financialisation in Crisis (Brill, 2012).  
  El capitalismo financiarizado Expansión y crisis (2009).  
 editor with Makoto Noguchi, Beyond Market-Driven Development (Routledge, 2004). 
 Social Foundations of Markets, Money and Credit (Routledge, 2003).   
 co-author with Makoto Itoh, Political Economy of Money and Finance. (London-Basingstoke: Macmillan, 1998).

Interviews
 "Greece: Phase Two", Jacobin (12 March 2015). Retrieved 2 April 2018.
 Costas Lapavitsas on HARDtalk, BBC (12 January 2015). Retrieved 2 April 2018.
 "The Credit Crunch", International Socialism 117 (Winter 2008). Retrieved 2 April 2018.

Articles
  Costas Lapavitsas on the Guardian
 Costas Lapavitsas on Jacobin

External links
  
 Costas Lapavitsas at SOAS
 Research on Money and Finance

References

21st-century Greek economists
Living people
Alumni of the London School of Economics
Alumni of Birkbeck, University of London
Economics educators
Marxian economists
Financial economists
Syriza politicians
Greek MPs 2015 (February–August)
1961 births
Academics of SOAS University of London
Politicians from Thessaloniki